Michael Addy (born 20 February 1943) is an English former professional footballer who played in the Football League as a wing half.

References
General
. Retrieved 31 October 2013.
Specific

1943 births
Living people
Sportspeople from Knottingley
Footballers from Yorkshire
English footballers
Association football wing halves
Leeds United F.C. players
Barnsley F.C. players
Corby Town F.C. players
Kettering Town F.C. players
English Football League players